The 2010 Bordj Menaïel bombing occurred on September 21, 2010 when a bomb detonated against the patrol of the Algerian police in the town of Bordj Menaïel, Boumerdès Province, Algeria killing 2 and injuring 3. The Al-Qaeda Organization in the Islamic Maghreb is suspected as being responsible.

See also
 Terrorist bombings in Algeria
 List of terrorist incidents, 2010

References

Boumerdès Province
Suicide car and truck bombings in Algeria
Mass murder in 2010
Terrorist incidents in Algeria
Terrorist incidents in Algeria in 2010
2010 murders in Algeria
Islamic terrorism in Algeria